This is a list of parliamentary by-elections in Singapore since 1965, with the names of the incumbent and victor and their respective parties. Where seats changed political party at the election, the result is highlighted: blue for a People's Action Party gain and red for a Workers' Party gain.

There have been a total of 31 by-elections. The first was held in January 1966 and the most recent in May 2016.

By-elections

13th Parliament

12th Parliament

8th Parliament

5th Parliament

4th Parliament

2nd Parliament

1st Parliament

References

See also
 By-elections in Singapore
 Elections in Singapore
 Parliament of Singapore

 
By-elections
Singapore politics-related lists
Singapore